Scottie Nell Hughes (born ) is an American journalist, news anchor and political commentator who was employed by RT. She was a paid CNN commentator during the 2016 presidential election, often speaking in support of then-candidate Donald Trump.

Hughes joined RT America as a full-time anchor in September 2018 and was the host of a daily news show News Views Hughes.

Biography
Hughes graduated with a broadcast communications/political science degree from the University of Tennessee at Martin. Her first network TV appearance was on CNN's Piers Morgan Live, where she defended the right to keep and bear arms; her brother Cliff had been shot and killed, before she was born.

Hughes began her career as an executive producer on the Steve Gill Show in Nashville, Tennessee. With an established radio career, she went on to take producing positions with The Rusty Humphries Show, The Michael Berry Show, The Mark Skoda Show, and many others. She also was in the first group of radio talk show hosts sent by the Department of Defense to travel to the front lines of Operation Enduring Freedom in Iraq and Kuwait, as well as the detention facilities at Guantánamo Bay, Cuba.

On , Hughes sued Fox News asserting she had been raped by Fox Business Network host Charles Payne. He denied the accusation, was suspended by the network pending an investigation into his conduct and, after the investigation was completed, was reinstated. Hughes said the subsequent two-year sexual relationship with Payne was coerced and that she believed it would help her obtain a permanent position at the network. Her appearances were drastically reduced after she ended the relationship in 2015 and reported Payne to Fox. She sued Fox for retaliation for reduction of her appearances on Fox, which suit was settled with details unknown.

She wrote the 2014 Roar: The New Conservative Woman Speaks Out.

In a live interview broadcast on CNN the day before the 2016 presidential election, she confused the word "Molotov" with mazel tov, a Jewish expression of congratulations or good luck, when she stated that a video by rap music artist and Hillary Clinton supporter Jay-Z begins "with a crowd throwing mazel tov cocktails."

References

External links 
 
 

21st-century American women
1980 births
American political commentators
American women journalists
CNN people
Living people
RT (TV network) people
Tennessee Republicans
University of Tennessee at Martin alumni